The 2021–22 season is Napoli Basket's 5th in existence and the club's 1st season in the top tier Italian basketball.

Kit 
Supplier: EYE Sport Wear / Sponsor: GeVi

Players

Current roster 
  }}

Depth chart

Squad changes

In 

|}

Out 

|}

Confirmed 

|}

Coach

Competitions

Supercup

Serie A

References 

Napoli